Echinocyamus is a genus of echinoderms belonging to the family Fibulariidae.

The genus has almost cosmopolitan distribution.

Species:

Echinocyamus apicatus 
Echinocyamus avilensis 
Echinocyamus basseae 
Echinocyamus bernaniensis 
Echinocyamus bisexus 
Echinocyamus bisperforatus 
Echinocyamus caribbeanensis 
Echinocyamus chipolanus 
Echinocyamus convergens 
Echinocyamus crispus 
Echinocyamus cyphostomus 
Echinocyamus elegans 
Echinocyamus grandiporus 
Echinocyamus grandis 
Echinocyamus gurnahensis 
Echinocyamus hungaricus 
Echinocyamus huxleyanus 
Echinocyamus incertus 
Echinocyamus insularis 
Echinocyamus intermedius 
Echinocyamus jacqueli 
Echinocyamus jaisalmerensis 
Echinocyamus jeanneti 
Echinocyamus kamrupensis 
Echinocyamus lipparinii 
Echinocyamus macneili 
Echinocyamus macrostomus 
Echinocyamus maropiensis 
Echinocyamus megapetalus 
Echinocyamus meridionalis 
Echinocyamus nummulicus
Echinocyamus nummuliticus 
Echinocyamus pannonicus 
Echinocyamus parviporus 
Echinocyamus parvus 
Echinocyamus petalus 
Echinocyamus planissimus 
Echinocyamus planus 
Echinocyamus platytatus 
Echinocyamus prostratus 
Echinocyamus provectus 
Echinocyamus pusillus 
Echinocyamus raoi 
Echinocyamus rostratus 
Echinocyamus scaber 
Echinocyamus schoelleri 
Echinocyamus sollers 
Echinocyamus subpiriformis 
Echinocyamus texanus 
Echinocyamus truncatus 
Echinocyamus vaughani 
Echinocyamus wilsoni 
Echinocyamus woodi

References

Clypeasteroida
Echinoidea genera